Mátyás Szűrös (born 11 September 1933 in Püspökladány) is a Hungarian politician. He served as provisional president of the Republic from 23 October 1989 to 2 May 1990. His presidency occurred during Hungary's transition from Communism to democratic government.

Biography
Szűrös served as Speaker of the National Assembly of Hungary from March 1989 to May 1990. In the fall of 1989, as part of an agreement between the Communists and the opposition to establish multiparty democracy, the 1949 Constitution was almost completely rewritten to remove its Communist character. The Presidential Council, the country's Communist-era collective presidency, was dissolved. Under the Constitution, Szűrös became provisional president until the election. Soon after taking office on 23 October he made the official proclamation that Hungary had removed the "People's Republic" from its constitutional name and was now the "Republic of Hungary."

He remained in parliament until 2002 as a member of the Hungarian Socialist Party, often voting against the party consensus. He quit the party in 2002, joined the newly established New Left Party and ran as their prime minister candidate at the parliamentary elections, but the party only got 0.1% of the popular votes. In 2003 he joined the Social Democratic Party and was later elected as the chairman of the party. He resigned his position in 2005.

References

1933 births
Living people
People from Püspökladány
Speakers of the National Assembly of Hungary
Presidents of Hungary
Hungarian Socialist Party politicians
Members of the National Assembly of Hungary (1985–1990)
Members of the National Assembly of Hungary (1990–1994)
Members of the National Assembly of Hungary (1994–1998)
Members of the National Assembly of Hungary (1998–2002)